Arturo Lang-Lenton León (born 28 January 1949) is a Spanish former swimmer who competed in the 1968 Summer Olympics and in the 1972 Summer Olympics. He was born in Las Palmas.

Notes

References

External links
 
 
 
 

1949 births
Living people
Sportspeople from Las Palmas
Spanish male butterfly swimmers
Olympic swimmers of Spain
Swimmers at the 1968 Summer Olympics
Swimmers at the 1972 Summer Olympics
Mediterranean Games gold medalists for Spain
Swimmers at the 1971 Mediterranean Games
Mediterranean Games medalists in swimming
Swimmers at the 1967 Mediterranean Games
20th-century Spanish people